The 2005 Boise State Broncos football team represented Boise State University during the 2005 NCAA Division I-A football season. Boise State competed as a member of the Western Athletic Conference (WAC), and played their home games at Bronco Stadium in Boise, Idaho. The Broncos were led by fifth-year head coach Dan Hawkins. He resigned at the end of the regular season to take the head coaching job at Colorado, but remained to coach the Broncos in their bowl game.  The Broncos finished the season 9–4 and 7–1 in conference to win their fourth straight WAC title (shared with Nevada) and played in the MPC Computers Bowl, where they lost to Boston College, 27–21.

Schedule

References

Boise State
Boise State Broncos football seasons
Western Athletic Conference football champion seasons
Boise State Broncos football